Govalan (also Romanized as Govālān; also known as Gūgalān) is a village in Zanjanrud-e Pain Rural District, Zanjanrud District, Zanjan County, Zanjan Province, Iran. At the 2006 census, its population was 336, in 78 families.

References 

Populated places in Zanjan County